Brevik may refer to:

 Brevik, Akershus, Norway
 Brevik, Minnesota, United States
 Brevik, Norway, a town in the municipality of Porsgrunn, Telemark
 Brevik, Sweden, a town on the island of Lidingo, Stockholm County
 SS Brevik (1909), a Swedish steamship built in 1909

People with the surname
 David Brevik (born 1968), American video game designer, producer and programmer

See also
 
 Brevig (disambiguation)
 Breivik (disambiguation)